This is a list of Catholic churches in Bulgaria.

Cathedrals

Cathedral of St Joseph, Sofia
Cathedral of St Louis (Plovdiv)
St Paul of the Cross Cathedral

Other churches

See also
Bulgarian Greek Catholic Church

Lists of religious buildings and structures in Bulgaria
Bulgaria